The 2011 Whites Drug Store Classic was held from November 11 to 14 at the Swan River Curling Club in Swan River, Manitoba as part of the 2011–12 World Curling Tour. The purse for the event was CAD$44,000, with the event held in a triple knockout format. The winning team was David Bohn's squad from Winnipeg, with Reid Carruthers filling in as skip.

Teams

Results

A Event

B Event

C Event

Playoffs

External links

Official Website

2011 in curling
Whites Drug Store Classic
Curling in Manitoba